Gwredog is a village in the  community of Llannerch-y-medd, Ynys Môn, Wales, which is  from Cardiff and  from London.

References

See also
List of localities in Wales by population

Villages in Anglesey